Marcia G. Taylor (born 1944) is an American businesswoman and philanthropist who is the incumbent chief executive officer (CEO) of Bennett International Group.

In 2012, she received the National Transportation Award for her services to trucking industry.

Early life
Taylor was born in Bluford, Illinois, in 1944 and grew up on a farm.

Career
Taylor started her career in 1971, when she moved to Georgia to work for Specialized Truck Services.

In 1974, Taylor bought a trucking company, George Bennett Motor Express, with her husband, J. D. Garrison.

In 2012, her company, Bennett International Group, was named Georgia's Family Business of the Year. In the same year, she founded The Taylor Family Foundation to support various charities. Two years later, she was called an influential women in trucking industry by the Fleet Equipment Magazine.

In 2015, Taylor established a scholarship at the Clayton State University for supply chain management students.
 
In 2016, Taylor received an honorary doctorate of commerce from Clayton State University. The following year, she was inducted in the Horatio Alger Association of Distinguished Americans. Later, in 2017, she received Women Who Mean Business Award, given by the Atlanta Business Journal.

Awards and recognition
 2012: National Transportation Award
 2017: Horatio Alger Association of Distinguished Americans

References

External links
Southern Journal Magazine

1944 births
Living people
American women company founders
American women chief executives